IEET may refer to:

Institute for Ethics and Emerging Technologies
Institute of Engineering and Emerging Technologies, former name of Baddi University of Emerging Sciences and Technologies
Institute of Engineering Education Taiwan